the WAFF U-23 Championship is an international football competition organised by the West Asian Football Federation (WAFF) for the men's under-23 national teams of West Asia.

Results

Teams reaching the top four

 Results from host teams shown in bold

Comprehensive team results by tournament
Legend
 – Champions
 – Runners-up
 – Third place (not determined after 2015)
 – Fourth place (not determined after 2015)
 – Semi-finals (since 2021)
 – Quarter-finals
GS – Group stage
Q – Qualified for upcoming tournament
 – Did not qualify
 – Did not enter / Withdrew / Banned
 – Hosts

For each tournament, the number of teams in each finals tournament (in brackets) are shown.

Awards

Winning coaches

Overall team records
Teams are ranked by total points, then by goal difference, then by goals scored.

See also 
 WAFF Championship
 AFC U-23 Asian Cup

References

Under-23 association football
WAFF Championship tournaments